Gnamptonychia is a genus of moths in the family Erebidae. The genus was erected by George Hampson in 1900.

Species
Gnamptonychia ventralis Barnes & Lindsey, 1921
Gnamptonychia flavicollis (Druce, 1885)

References

Lithosiina
Moth genera